Abacetus pygmaeus is a species of ground beetle in the subfamily Pterostichinae. It was described by Boheman in 1848.

References

pygmaeus
Beetles described in 1848